Mourad Ait Ouarab is an Algerian handball coach of the Algerian national team.

References

Living people
Algerian handball coaches
Year of birth missing (living people)
21st-century Algerian people